"Clubbed to Death" is an instrumental composition by Australian music producer Rob Dougan, originally released on Mo'Wax records in 1995. It featured in the 1997 film Clubbed to Death and was given renewed attention in 1999 due to its inclusion in the film The Matrix. It was re-released with new remixes in 2002.

Release
The subtitle Kurayamino variation is based on the Japanese for "of the darkness". The song samples "It's a New Day" by Skull Snaps. The short strings introduction is an excerpt from the first movement of Edward Elgar's Enigma Variations, and the piano solo is improvised around Elgar's theme.

Track listing

Clubbed to Death (Compact Disc Experience)
Mo Wax, MW037CD, 1995
 "The First Mix" – 7:12
 "Kurayamino Variation" – 7:29
 "La Funk Mob Variation" – 8:08
 "Peshay Remix" – 6:06
 "Spoon Mix" remixed by Carl Craig – 5:55
 "Clubbed to Death Darkside" remixed by La Funk Mob – 5:05

Clubbed to Death #1
Mo Wax, MW037, 1995
 "La Funk Mob Variation"	
 "Clubbed to Death Darkside"	
 "The First Mix"

Clubbed to Death #2
Mo Wax, MW037R, 1995
 "Kurayamino Variation"
 "Peshay Remix"
 "Spoon Mix"	
 "Totally Waxed Remix" remixed by Wax Doctor

Charts

References

External links
 

1995 singles
2002 singles
Dystopian music
The Matrix (franchise) music
1995 instrumentals
1995 songs
Wang Chung (band)
Edward Elgar
Music videos directed by David Slade